HMS Jewel (J390) was a turbine engine-powered  during the Second World War.

Design and description

The ships' complement consisted of 85 officers and ratings.

The reciprocating ships had two vertical triple-expansion steam engines, each driving one shaft, using steam provided by two Admiralty three-drum boilers.

The Algerine class was armed with a QF  Mk V anti-aircraft gun and four twin-gun mounts for Oerlikon 20 mm cannon. The latter guns were in short supply when the first ships were being completed and they often got a proportion of single mounts. By 1944, single-barrel Bofors 40 mm mounts began replacing the twin 20 mm mounts on a one for one basis. All of the ships were fitted for four throwers and two rails for depth charges.

Construction and career
The ship was ordered on 30 April 1942 at the Harland & Wolff at Belfast, Ireland. She was laid down on 27 November 1943 and launched on 20 July 1944. The ship was commissioned on 9 December 1944.

On 21 February 1945, she was deployed to Scapa Flow during Operation Shred. Two days later, she swept the Norwegian waters during Operation Groundsheet. In October, she was stationed in Singapore as part of the 10th Flotilla.

In September 1946, the ship was sent back to the UK to be decommissioned on arrival. The ship was put into the reserve fleet and laid up at Harwich until the ship was transferred to be used as a RNVR Drill Ship at Dundee in January 1948.

On 28 December 1955, she was recommissioned into the Dartmouth Training Squadron in which she trained Cadets from the Royal Naval College at Dartmouth until 1961.

In 1956 she was the starting vessel for the Torbay to Lisbon yacht race - now considered to be the first modern Tall Ship Race.

In 1966, she was put on the disposal list and sold to BISCO for scrap at Inverkeithing, Scotland in which she arrived on 7 April 1967.

References

Bibliography
 
 
 Peter Elliott (1977) Allied Escort Ships of World War II. MacDonald & Janes,

External links
 

 

Algerine-class minesweepers of the Royal Navy
Ships built in Belfast
1944 ships
World War II minesweepers of the United Kingdom